Pacchiarotto, and How He Worked in Distemper is a short collection of English poems by Robert Browning, published in 1876. The collection marked Browning's first collection of short pieces for more than twelve years, and was well received. The title poem, which ostensibly discusses the life and works of 15th Century Italian painter Giacomo Pacchiarotti, is actually a thinly veiled attack on Browning's own critics, and many other pieces in the collection take the same tone.

Contents 

 Prologue
 Of Pacchiarotto, and How He Worked in Distemper
 At the "Mermaid"
 House
 Shop
 Pisgah-Sights
 Fears and Scruples
 Natural Magic
 Magical Nature
 Bifurcation
 Numpholeptos
 Appearances
 St. Martin's Summer
 Hervé Riel
 A Forgiveness
 Cenciaja
 Filippo Baldinucci on the Privilege of Burial
 Epilogue

Poetry by Robert Browning
1876 poems
British poetry collections